Brachycythara alba is a species of sea snail, a marine gastropod mollusk in the family Mangeliidae, the cone snails and their allies.

Description
The length of the shell attains 5.5 mm.

Distribution
This species occurs in the Caribbean Sea and the Lesser Antilles.

References

 Rolán E. & Espinosa J. (1999). El complejo Brachycythara biconica (C. B. Adams, 1850) (Mollusca: Gastropoda: Turridae) en Cuba, con la descripción de una nueva especie. Bollettino Malacologico, 34(1-4): 43-49

External links
 
  Tucker, J.K. 2004 Catalog of recent and fossil turrids (Mollusca: Gastropoda). Zootaxa 682:1–1295.
 Espinosa, José, et al. "Moluscos marinos. Reserva de la Biosfera de la Península de Guanahacabibes." Instituto de Oceanología, La Habana, Cuba (2012).
 MNHN, Paris: Brachycythara alba

alba